Beaconsfield is a town in Buckinghamshire, England. 

Beaconsfield may also refer to:

Places

Australia 
Beaconsfield, Sydney, New South Wales
Beaconsfield, Queensland, a town in the Mackay Region, Queensland, Australia
Beaconsfield, Tasmania, a town
Beaconsfield, Victoria, a suburb in Melbourne, Victoria
Beaconsfield, Western Australia, a suburb of Perth

Canada 
Beaconsfield, Ontario
Beaconsfield, Quebec, a city on the Island of Montreal

South Africa 
 Beaconsfield, Kimberley

United Kingdom 
 Beaconsfield (district), a former local government district of Buckinghamshire

United States 
Beaconsfield (Houston), a NRHP-listed apartment building
Beaconsfield, Iowa

Other uses 
 Beaconsfield (film), a 2012 Australian television film
 Beaconsfield (gallery), an art gallery in Vauxhall
 Beaconsfield (UK Parliament constituency)
 Earl of Beaconsfield, created in 1876 for Prime Minister Benjamin Disraeli

See also 
 Beaconsfield Mine collapse, a 2006 mine collapse in Tasmania
 Beaconsfield station (disambiguation)